The Tarim mummies are a series of mummies discovered in the Tarim Basin in present-day Xinjiang, China, which date from 1800 BC to the first centuries BC, with a new group of individuals recently dated to between c. 2100 and 1700 BC. The mummies, particularly the early ones, are frequently associated with the presence of the Indo-European Tocharian languages in the Tarim Basin, although the evidence is not totally conclusive and many centuries separate these mummies from the first attestation of the Tocharian languages in writing. The mummies have been described as being both "Caucasoid" and "Mongoloid" and mixed-race individuals are also observed.  Victor H. Mair's team concluded that the mummies are possibly speakers of Indo-European languages such as the Tocharians. A study published in 2021 suggests that the earliest Tarim Basin cultures appear to have had high levels of Ancient North Eurasian ancestry, with smaller admixture from Northeast Asians.

Archaeological record

At the beginning of the 20th century, European explorers such as Sven Hedin, Albert von Le Coq and Sir Aurel Stein all recounted their discoveries of desiccated bodies in their search for antiquities in Central Asia. Since then, numerous other mummies have been found and analyzed, many of them now displayed in the museums of Xinjiang. Most of these mummies were found on the eastern end of the Tarim Basin (around the area of Lopnur, Subeshi near Turpan, Loulan, Kumul), or along the southern edge of the Tarim Basin (Khotan, Niya, and Cherchen or Qiemo).

The earliest Tarim mummies, found at Qäwrighul and dated to 1800 BCE, are of a Caucasian physical type whose closest affiliation is to the Bronze Age populations of southern Siberia, Kazakhstan, Central Asia, and the Lower Volga.

The cemetery at  contained 29 mummies which dated from 1100 to 500 BCE, 21 of which are Mongoloid—the earliest Mongoloid mummies found in the Tarim Basin—and eight of which are of the same Caucasian physical type as found at Qäwrighul.

Notable mummies are the tall, red-haired "Chärchän man" or the "Ur-David" (1000 BCE); his son (1000 BCE), a small 1-year-old baby with brown hair protruding from under a red and blue felt cap, with two stones positioned over its eyes; the "Hami Mummy" (c. 1400–800 BCE), a "red-headed beauty" found in Qizilchoqa; and the "Witches of Subeshi" (4th or 3rd century BCE), who wore  black felt conical hats with a flat brim. Also found at Subeshi was a man with traces of a surgical operation on his abdomen; the incision is sewn up with sutures made of horsehair.

Many of the mummies have been found in very good condition, owing to the dryness of the desert and the desiccation it produced in the corpses. The mummies share many typical Caucasian body features (tall stature, high cheekbones, deep-set eyes), and many of them have their hair physically intact, ranging in color from blond to red to deep brown, and generally long, curly and braided. Their costumes, and especially textiles, may indicate a common origin with Indo-European neolithic clothing techniques or a common low-level textile technology. Chärchän man wore a red twill tunic and tartan leggings. Textile expert Elizabeth Wayland Barber, who examined the tartan-style cloth, discusses similarities between it and fragments recovered from salt mines associated with the Hallstatt culture. As a result of the arid conditions and exceptional preservation, tattoos have been identified on mummies from several sites around the Tarim Basin, including Qäwrighul, Yanghai, Shengjindian, Shanpula (Sampul), Zaghunluq, and Qizilchoqa.

It has been asserted that the textiles found with the mummies are of an early European textile type based on close similarities to fragmentary textiles found in salt mines in Austria, dating from the second millennium BCE. Anthropologist Irene Good, a specialist in early Eurasian textiles, noted the woven diagonal twill pattern indicated the use of a rather sophisticated loom and said that the textile is "the easternmost known example of this kind of weaving technique."

Genetic studies

In 1995, Mair claimed that "the earliest mummies in the Tarim Basin were exclusively Caucasoid, or Europoid" with east Asian migrants arriving in the eastern portions of the Tarim Basin around 3,000 years ago while the Uyghur peoples arrived around the year 842. In trying to trace the origins of these populations, Victor Mair's team suggested that they may have arrived in the region by way of the Pamir Mountains about 5,000 years ago.

Mair has claimed that:

In 2007 the Chinese government allowed a National Geographic Society team headed by Spencer Wells to examine the mummies' DNA. Wells was able to extract undegraded DNA from the internal tissues. The scientists extracted enough material to suggest the Tarim Basin was continually inhabited from 2000 BCE to 300 BCE and preliminary results indicate the people, rather than having a single origin, originated from Europe, Mesopotamia, Indus Valley and other regions yet to be determined.

A 2008 study by Jilin University showed that the Yuansha population has relatively close relationships with the modern populations of South Central Asia and Indus Valley, as well as with the ancient population of Chawuhu.

Between 2009 and 2015, the remains of 92 individuals found at the Xiaohe Tomb complex were analyzed for Y-DNA and mtDNA markers. Genetic analyses of the mummies showed that the maternal lineages of the Xiaohe people originated from both East Asia and West Eurasia, whereas the paternal lineages all originated from West Eurasia.

Mitochondrial DNA analysis showed that maternal lineages carried by the people at Xiaohe included mtDNA  haplogroups H, K, U5, U7, U2e, T and R*, which are now most common in West Eurasia. Also found were haplogroups common in modern populations from East Asia: B5, D and G2a. Haplogroups now common in Central Asian or Siberian populations included: C4 and C5. Haplogroups later regarded as typically South Asian included M5 and M*.

A 2018 study the paternal lines of male remains surveyed nearly all – 11 out of 12, or around 92% – belonged to Y-DNA haplogroup R1a1-M17 (Z93-), which are now most common in Northern India and Eastern Europe; the other belonged to the exceptionally rare paragroup K* (M9) from Asia.

The geographic location of this admixing is unknown, although south Siberia is likely.

Chinese historian Ji Xianlin says China "supported and admired" research by foreign experts into the mummies. "However, within China a small group of ethnic separatists have taken advantage of this opportunity to stir up trouble and are acting like buffoons. Some of them have even styled themselves the descendants of these ancient 'white people' with the aim of dividing the motherland. But these perverse acts will not succeed." Barber addresses these claims by noting that "The Loulan Beauty is scarcely closer to 'Turkic' in her anthropological type than she is to Han Chinese. The body and facial forms associated with Turks and Mongols began to appear in the Tarim cemeteries only in the first millennium BCE, fifteen hundred years after this woman lived." Due to the "fear of fuelling separatist currents", the Xinjiang museum, regardless of dating, displays all their mummies, both Tarim and Han, together.

The School of Life Sciences, Jilin University, China, analyzed in 2021 13 individuals from the Tarim basin, dated to c. 2100-1700 BC, and assigned 2 to Y-haplogroup R1b1b-PH155/PH4796 (R1b1c in ISOGG2016), 1 — to Y-haplogroup R1-PF6136 (xR1a, xR1b1a).

A 2022 genetic study on the Tarim mummies found that they were primarily descended from a population related to the Ancient North Eurasians. Tests on their genetic legacy found that many groups in Central Asia and Xinjiang derive varying degrees of ancestry from a population related to the Tarim mummies. The Tajik people show the relative highest affinity with the Tarim mummies, although their main ancestry is linked to Bronze Age Steppe pastoralists (Western Steppe Herders).

Posited origins

Mallory and Mair (2000) propose the movement of at least two Caucasian physical types into the Tarim Basin. The authors associate these types with the Tocharian and Iranian (Saka) branches of the Indo-European language family, respectively. However, archaeology and linguistics professor Elizabeth Wayland Barber cautions against assuming the mummies spoke Tocharian, noting a gap of about a thousand years between the mummies and the documented Tocharians: "people can change their language at will, without altering a single gene or freckle."

On the other hand, linguistics professor Ronald Kim argues that the amount of divergence between the attested Tocharian languages necessitates that Proto-Tocharian must have preceded their attestation by a millennium or so. This would coincide with the timeframe during which the Tarim Basin culture was in the region.

Because craniometry can produce results which make no sense at all (e.g. the close relationship between Neolithic populations in Ukraine and Portugal)  and therefore lack any historical meaning, any putative genetic relationship must be consistent with geographical plausibility and have the support of other evidence.

Han Kangxin, who examined the skulls of 302 mummies, found the closest relatives of the earlier Tarim Basin population in the populations of the Afanasevo culture situated immediately north of the Tarim Basin and the Andronovo culture that spanned Kazakhstan and reached southwards into West Central Asia and the Altai.

It is the Afanasevo culture to which  trace the earliest Bronze Age settlers of the Tarim and Turpan basins. The Afanasevo culture (c. 3500–2500 BCE) displays cultural and genetic connections with the Indo-European-associated cultures of the Eurasian Steppe yet predates the specifically Indo-Iranian-associated Andronovo culture (c. 2000–900 BCE) enough to isolate the Tocharian languages from Indo-Iranian linguistic innovations like satemization.

 confirm a second Caucasian physical type at Alwighul (700–1 BCE) and Krorän (200 CE) different from the earlier one found at Qäwrighul (1800 BCE) and Yanbulaq (1100–500 BCE):

Mallory and Mair associate this later (700 BCE–200 CE) Caucasian physical type with the populations who introduced the Iranian Saka language to the western part of the Tarim basin.

Mair concluded:

Historical records and associated texts

Chinese sources 

Western Regions (Hsi-yu) is the historical name in China, between the 3rd century BCE and 8th century CE for regions west of Yumen Pass, including the Tarim and Central Asia.

Some of the peoples of the Western Regions were described in Chinese sources as having full beards, red or blond hair, deep-set blue or green eyes and high noses. According to Chinese sources, the city states of the Tarim reached the height of their political power during the 3rd to 4th centuries CE, although this may actually indicate an increase in Chinese involvement in the Tarim, following the collapse of the Kushan Empire.

The Yuezhi

Reference to the Yuezhi name was possibly made around 7th century BCE by the Chinese philosopher Guan Zhong, though his book is generally considered to be a later forgery. Guan Zhong described a group called either the Yuzhi 禺氏 or Niuzhi 牛氏 as a people from the north-west who supplied jade to the Chinese from the nearby mountains of Yuzhi 禺氏 at Gansu.

After the Yuezhi experienced a series of major defeats at the hands of the Xiongnu, during the 2nd century BCE, a group known as the Greater Yuezhi migrated to Bactria, where they established the Kushan Empire. By the 1st Century CE, the Kushan Empire had expanded significantly and may have annexed part of the Tarim Basin.

Tocharian languages

The degree of differentiation between the language known to modern scholars as Tocharian A (or by the endonym Ārśi-käntwa; "tongue of Ārśi") and Tocharian B (Kuśiññe; [adjective] "of Kucha, Kuchean"), as well as the less-well attested Tocharian C (which is associated with the city-state of Krorän, also known as Loulan), and the absence of evidence for these beyond the Tarim, tends to indicate that a common, proto-Tocharian language existed in the Tarim during the second half of the 1st Millennium BCE. Tocharian is attested in documents between the 3rd and 9th centuries CE, although the first known epigraphic evidence dates to the 6th century CE.

Although the Tarim mummies preceded the Tocharian texts by several centuries, their shared geographical location and links to Western Eurasia have led many scholars to infer that the mummies were related to the Tocharian peoples.

Arguments for cultural transmission from West to East
The possible presence of speakers of Indo-European languages in the Tarim Basin by about 2000 BCE could, if confirmed, be interpreted as evidence that cultural exchanges occurred among Indo-European and Chinese populations at a very early date. It has been suggested that such techniques as chariot warfare and bronze-making may have been transmitted to the east by these Indo-European nomads. Mallory and Mair also note that: "Prior to c. 2000 BC, finds of metal artifacts in China are exceedingly few, simple and, puzzlingly, already made of alloyed copper (and hence questionable)." While stressing that the argument as to whether bronze technology travelled from China to the West or that "the earliest bronze technology in China was stimulated by contacts with western steppe cultures", is far from settled in scholarly circles, they suggest that the evidence so far favours the latter scenario. However, the culture and the technology in the northwest region of Tarim basin were less advanced than that in the East China of Yellow River-Erlitou (2070 BCE ~ 1600 BCE) or Majiayao culture (3100 BCE ~ 2600 BCE), the earliest bronze-using cultures in China, which implies that the northwest region did not use copper or any metal until bronze technology was introduced to the region by the Shang dynasty in about 1600 BC. The earliest bronze artifacts in China are found at the Majiayao site (between 3100 and 2700 BC), and it is from this location and time period that Chinese Bronze Age spread. Bronze metallurgy in China originated in what is referred to as the Erlitou period, which some historians argue places it within the range of dates controlled by the Shang dynasty. Others believe the Erlitou sites belong to the preceding Xia dynasty. The US National Gallery of Art defines the Chinese Bronze Age as the "period between about 2000 BC and 771 BC," which begins with Erlitou culture and ends abruptly with the disintegration of Western Zhou rule. Though that provides a concise frame of reference, it overlooks the continued importance of bronze in Chinese metallurgy and culture. Since that was significantly later than the discovery of bronze in Mesopotamia, bronze technology could have been imported, rather than being discovered independently in China. However, there is reason to believe that bronzework developed inside China, separately from outside influence.

The Chinese official Zhang Qian, who visited Bactria and Sogdiana in 126 BCE, made the first known Chinese report on many regions west of China. He believed to have discerned Greek influences in some of the kingdoms. He named Parthia "Ānxī" (Chinese: 安息), a transcription of "Arshak" (Arsaces), the name of the founder of Parthian dynasty. Zhang Qian clearly identified Parthia as an advanced urban civilization that farmed grain and grapes and manufactured silver coins and leather goods. Zhang Qian equated Parthia's level of advancement to the cultures of Dayuan in Ferghana and Daxia in Bactria.

The supplying of Tarim Basin jade to China from ancient times is well established, according to : "It is well known that ancient Chinese rulers had a strong attachment to jade. All of the jade items excavated from the tomb of Fuhao of the Shang dynasty by Zheng Zhenxiang, more than 750 pieces, were from Khotan in modern Xinjiang. As early as the mid-first millennium BCE the Yuezhi engaged in the jade trade, of which the major consumers were the rulers of agricultural China."

The Princess of Xiaohe 
The Princess of Xiaohe was unearthed and also named by the archaeologists of Xinjiang Institute of Archaeology at Xiaohe Cemetery Tomb M11, 102 km west of Loulan, Nop Nur, Xinjiang in 2003. She has flaxen hair and long eyelashes and was wrapped in a white wool cloak with tassels and wore a felt hat, string skirt, and fur-lined leather boots. She was buried with wooden pins and three small pouches of ephedra and twigs and branches of ephedra were placed beside the body. She is not permanently exhibited in any museum.

The Beauty of Loulan 

The Beauty of Loulan (also referred to as the Loulan Beauty) is the most famous of the Tarim mummies, along with the Cherchen Man. She was discovered in 1980 by Chinese archaeologists working on a film about the Silk Road. The mummy was discovered near Lop Nur. She was buried 3 feet beneath the ground. The mummy was extremely well preserved because of the dry climate and the preservative properties of salt. She was wrapped in a woolen cloth; the cloth was made of two separate pieces and was not large enough to cover her entire body, thereby leaving her ankles exposed. The Beauty of Loulan was surrounded by funerary gifts. The Beauty of Loulan has been dated back to approximately 1800 BCE.

Life and death 
The Beauty of Loulan lived around 1800 BCE, until about the age of 45, when she died. Her cause of death is likely due to lung failure from ingesting a large amount of sand, charcoal, and dust. According to Elizabeth Barber, she probably died in the winter because of her provisions against the cold. The rough shape of her clothes and the lice in her hair suggest she lived a difficult life.

Appearance and clothing

Hair 
The Beauty of Loulan's hair colour has been described as auburn. Her hair was infested with lice.

Clothing 
The Beauty of Loulan is wearing clothing made of wool and fur. Her hood is made of felt and has a feather in it. She is wearing rough ankle-high moccasins made of leather, with fur on the outside. Her skirt is made of leather, with fur on the inside for warmth. She is also wearing a woolen cap. According to Elizabeth Barber, these provisions against the cold suggest she died during the winter.

Accessories 
The Beauty of Loulan possesses a comb, with four teeth remaining. Barber suggests that this comb was a dual purpose tool to comb hair and to "pack the weft in tightly during weaving."

She possesses a "neatly woven bag or soft basket." Grains of wheat were discovered inside the bag.

In popular culture 
A 23-poem sequence on the Beauty of Loulan appears in the Canadian poet Kim Trainor's Karyotype (2015).

Controversies 
According to Ed Wong's New York Times article from 2008, Mair was actually prohibited from leaving the country with 52 genetic samples. However, a Chinese scientist clandestinely sent him half a dozen, on which an Italian geneticist performed tests.

Since then China has prohibited foreign scientists from conducting research on the mummies. As Wong says, "Despite the political issues, excavations of the grave sites are continuing."

See also
 Pazyryk culture
 Pontic–Caspian steppe
 Dzungarian Gate
 Gushi culture
 Tocharian clothing

Footnotes

References

 
 
 
 .
 .
 .
  
 .
 .
 .
 .
 .

External links
 Stratification in the peopling of China: how far does the linguistic evidence match genetics and archaeology? pdf
 High-quality images of Tarim-basin mummies
 Images of the Tocharian mummies Includes the face of the "Beauty of Loulan" as reconstructed by an artist.
 
 Genetic testing reveals awkward truth about Xinjiang's famous mummies (AFP) Khaleej Times Online, 19 April 2005
 The Dead Tell a Tale China Doesn't Care to Listen To The New York Times, 18 November 2008
 'A Host of Mummies, A Forest of Secrets', Nicholas Wade, The New York Times, 15 March 2010.